təmtəmíxʷtən/Belcarra Regional Park is a  regional park located in Belcarra, Greater Vancouver, British Columbia. It is northeast of the meeting of Burrard Inlet with Indian Arm, beginning near Belcarra Bay and extending to Sasamat Lake.  Sasamat is one of the warmest lakes in Greater Vancouver. The park is northwest of the Village of Anmore and to the southwest of Buntzen Lake.

Included in the park is a First Nations archaeological site, which is operated and maintained by Metro Vancouver Regional Parks.

In October 2021, the park was renamed from "Belcarra Regional Park" to "təmtəmíxʷtən/Belcarra Regional Park", to reflect the Indigenous history.

References

Belcarra
Port Moody
Parks in Greater Vancouver
Regional parks of Canada
Archaeological sites in British Columbia